Kristina Lum (born October 18, 1976) is an American synchronized swimmer.

Teaming with partner Bill May, Lum won the duet event at the 1998 US national championships. The pair then won a silver medal in the same event at the 1998 Goodwill Games.

Kristina went on to compete in the women's team event at the 2000 Summer Olympics, finishing in fifth place. In 2012, she was inducted into the United States Synchronized Swimming Hall of Fame.

References

1976 births
Living people
American synchronized swimmers
Olympic synchronized swimmers of the United States
Synchronized swimmers at the 2000 Summer Olympics
World Aquatics Championships medalists in synchronised swimming
Synchronized swimmers at the 1998 World Aquatics Championships
Synchronized swimmers at the 2015 World Aquatics Championships
Competitors at the 1998 Goodwill Games